Bandai is a Japanese toy manufacturer.

Bandai may also refer to:

 Bandai, Fukushima, a town in Fukushima Prefecture, Japan
 Mount Bandai, in Fukushima Prefecture, Japan
 Bandai Visual, a Japanese anime company

See also
Ban Dai, village in Mae Sai District, Chiang Rai Province, Thailand
 Bandi (disambiguation)